Zamia variegata is a species of plant in the family Zamiaceae. It is native to Belize, Guatemala, Honduras, and Mexico. It grows in forests. It is threatened by habitat destruction, which has likely reduced the population by about 50% over the last few decades.

References

variegata
Endangered plants
Taxonomy articles created by Polbot